The toggling harpoon is an ancient weapon and tool used in whaling to impale a whale when thrown. Unlike earlier harpoon versions which had only one point, a toggling harpoon has a two-part point.  One half of the point is firmly attached to the thrusting base, while the other half of the point is fitted over this first point like a cap and attached to the rest of the point with sinew or another string-like material.  When the harpoon is thrust into an animal, the top half of the point detaches and twists horizontally into the animal under the skin, allowing hunters to haul the animal to ship or shore. This harpoon technology lodges the toggling head of the harpoon underneath both the animal's skin and blubber, and instead lodges the point in the muscle, which also prevents the harpoon slipping out.

History

Toggling harpoons are first associated with the Red Paint culture of New England and Atlantic Canada (c. 5500 BC to c. 4000 BC).  The earliest known toggling harpoon head was found at a 7000-year-old Red Paint burial site in Labrador, at the L'Anse Amour Site.  They were probably used to harvest swordfish and seals, the bones of which have been found at Red Paint sites.

Toggling harpoon technology was later used by the Thule tradition (c. 700 BC to present) of the Western Arctic,  in the Bering Strait area and further south along either Asian or Alaskan coasts.  The toggling harpoon was part of a hunting technology that focused intensely on the sea, and it improved life in the Arctic by providing eased subsistence to the sea-mammal hunters living there.

The grommet iron, a form of toggle harpoon with an iron head, was used in some European boats at least by 1772. The pivoting head and the shaft of this harpoon were held parallel by means of a grommet banded around them. The grommet slid off when the iron penetrated the whale (or fish), allowing the head to toggle open as the barb caught in the tissue.

In 1848 Lewis Temple, an African-American blacksmith in New Bedford, Massachusetts, adapted the toggling harpoon using a wooden shear pin to initially brace the toggle head, and created what came to be known as Temple's Toggle and later simply as the toggle iron or iron toggle harpoon. This harpoon became a whaling standard and replaced the fixed-point "two flue" and "single flue" harpoons that were widely used previously.

A symbol

This harpoon became so important to the industry that its shape continues to symbolize whaling in the modern day. A statue of a whaler hefting a toggling harpoon in New Bedford, Massachusetts has come to act as a symbol for the city itself.

References

Fagan, Brian.  Ancient North America.  Thames & Hudson, London. 2005, p. 194.

External links
Toggle irons history

Harpoons
Ancient weapons
Inuit tools